Boško Anić (born 27 July 1968) is a retired Croatian football defender who last played for Hajduk Split in Croatia's Prva HNL.

Club career
As a professional footballer, he started with Borac Banja Luka in Yugoslav First League. During his professional career he spent most of his time playing for various clubs in Croatia's Prva HNL.

References

External links
  article in SD (season 1985/86)

1968 births
Living people
People from Trilj
Association football defenders
Yugoslav footballers
Croatian footballers
NK Junak Sinj players
RNK Split players
FK Borac Banja Luka players
HNK Šibenik players
HNK Hajduk Split players
NK Zadar players
HNK Segesta players
NK Istra players
HNK Rijeka players
Yugoslav First League players
Croatian Football League players